Harry Towb (27 July 1925 – 24 July 2009) was an actor from Northern Ireland.

Early life and career
Towb was born in Larne, County Antrim, to a Russian-Jewish father and an Irish-Jewish mother; he once claimed he was the only Jew ever born in Larne. After his parents divorced, he moved with his mother and sister to north Belfast, where he attended the Finiston School and Technical College. He enlisted in the British Army during World War II and managed a military canteen, but was discharged once it emerged that he had lied about his age. He then appeared on stage with a touring theatre company in Ireland, in repertory theatre in England and in London's West End, where he had a role in the musical adaptation of Bar Mitzvah Boy. He also appeared in A Funny Thing Happened on the Way to the Forum at the National Theatre in 2004.

He made numerous appearances on UK television including popular UK TV series Callan, the Ronald Howard led Sherlock Holmes, The Avengers, Home James!, Casualty, The Bill, Minder, Doctor Who, The Saint, and Heartbeat. His film appearances include Above Us the Waves (1955), The Blue Max (1966), Prudence and the Pill (1968), Patton (1970) and Lamb (1985). In 1959 he appeared in a radio episode of Hancock's Half Hour, "Fred's Pie Stall". In December 2008, Towb appeared in two episodes of the BBC soap opera EastEnders as David, Janine Butcher's fiancé. He also appeared on the long-running BBC music hall show, The Good Old Days.

Harry Towb was also a regular presenter on the BBC Schools' programme You and Me featuring with Cosmo and Dibs. In the late 1970s, Towb appeared in a series of TV commercials advertising Younger's Tartan Special beer, which were shown on very heavy rotation in Scotland.

He appeared in the 1983 London production of the hit stage musical Little Shop of Horrors, starring the original American lead Ellen Greene, based on Roger Corman's low-budget horror movie.

Personal life
Harry Towb was married to the actress Diana Hoddinott, with whom he had three children. He died at his home in London from complications due to cancer. As his obituary in The Times said, "Asked, once, why he had become an actor, Harry Towb said it was because he had always wanted to be someone else." His "being fascinated by others... made him one of the finest character actors of his day", The Times continued. Towb, said one critic, "can be relied upon to add distinction to any production". Towb continued to identify with his Jewish background, and in 1983 recorded a documentary, Odd Men In, about Belfast's Jewish community. He would describe his interview with Belfast-born Chaim Herzog for this documentary as his proudest moment.

Selected filmography

 The Quiet Woman (1951) – Jim Cranshaw
 Gift Horse (1952) – Minor Role (uncredited)
 13 East Street (1952) – Ray
 Escape Route (1952) – Immigration Officer (uncredited)
 Escape by Night (1953) – Reporter (uncredited)
 Knave of Hearts (1954) – Stewart (uncredited)
 John Wesley (1954) – Michael O'Rory
 The Sleeping Tiger (1954) – Harry, second criminal
 A Prize of Gold (1955) – Benny
 Above Us the Waves (1955) – McCleery
 The Time of His Life (1955) – Steele
 Doublecross (1956) – Publican
 The March Hare (1956) – P.C. Dooney (uncredited)
 Eyewitness (1956) – Sugdon
 Circus Friends (1956) – Larry
 Stranger in Town (1957) – Café Attendant
 The End of the Line (1957) – Vince
 Murder at Site 3 (1958) – Kenney
 Dial 999 (TV Series, 'Rolling Racketeers', episode) - Harry
 The 39 Steps (1959) – Harold (uncredited)
 Crossroads to Crime (1960) – Paddy
 All Night Long (1962) – Phales
 The Scarlet Blade (1963) – Cobb (uncredited)
 The Blue Max (1966) – Kettering
 30 Is a Dangerous Age, Cynthia (1968) – Mr. Woolley
 Prudence and the Pill (1968) – Racetrack Official
 The Bliss of Mrs. Blossom (1968) – Doctor
 All Neat in Black Stockings (1968) – Issur
 The Mind of Mr. J.G. Reeder, (Tv. episode) - (1969–1971) – Lew Kassio
 Patton (1970) – American GI Cook (uncredited)
 Carry On at Your Convenience (1971) – Doctor in Film
 Some Kind of Hero (1972) – Mannie Greenbaum
 Digby, the Biggest Dog in the World (1973) – Ringmaster
 The Girl from Petrovka (1974) – American Reporter
 The Bunny Caper (aka Sex Play) (1974) – Four Star General
 Barry Lyndon (1975) – Innkeeper
 Rosie Dixon – Night Nurse (1978) – Mr. Phillips
 Lassiter (1984) – Roger Boardman
 Lamb (1985) – Priest
 Stowaways on the Ark (1988) – Noah
 Moll Flanders (1996) – Magistrate
 The Most Fertile Man in Ireland (2000) – Uncle Eugene
 Conspiracy of Silence (2003) – Father Doherty
 Cheeky (2003) – Mr. Oates

References

External links

National Theatre
Harry Towb Obituary in The Guardian

1925 births
2009 deaths
20th-century male actors from Northern Ireland
21st-century male actors from Northern Ireland
Male film actors from Northern Ireland
People from Northern Ireland of Russian-Jewish descent
Jews from Northern Ireland
British Army personnel of World War II
Jewish British male actors
Male musical theatre actors from Northern Ireland
Male stage actors from Northern Ireland
People from Larne
Male television actors from Northern Ireland
20th-century male singers from Northern Ireland